John Ronald McCormack (August 2, 1925 – February 22, 2017) was a Canadian ice hockey centre. He played in the National Hockey League with the Toronto Maple Leafs, Montreal Canadiens, and Chicago Black Hawks between 1948 and 1955. He was born in Edmonton, Alberta.

Playing career
McCormack's hockey career started off in the local Edmonton hockey leagues. As a star in the Juvenile division, McCormack's coach was in touch with the coach of the Hollywood Wolves who had other Edmonton players such as Harry Black, the father of Bud Black, and a 16 he went to Southern California. When the war threatened to end the SCHL, McCormack found his way to the St. Michael's Majors in Toronto. The Majors won the Memorial Cup in 1945. In those 9 playoff games McCormack had 10 goals and assisted on 11 others. After the playoffs McCormack enlisted in the Royal Canadian Navy.

In 1948 John played 3 games for the Toronto Maple Leafs but spent the majority of the time with the Toronto Marlies. In 1949–50, the Marlies won the Allan Cup. John contributed 7 goals and 8 assists in the 13 playoff games.

In 1950 while with the AHL Pittsburgh Hornets, McCormack played in the Calder Cup final, though the Hornets lost to the Cleveland Barons in 7 games. McCormack had 6 goals and 9 assists in the 13 playoff matches.

McCormack played with the Stanley Cup winning Toronto Maple Leafs in 1950–51. After the season he was sold to the Montreal Canadiens. The Canadiens went on to win the Cup in 1953.

McCormack played in the NHL for 8 seasons finishing his career with the Chicago Black Hawks before returning to Edmonton as player coach for the hometown Flyers and to raise his family.

Post-playing career
McCormack graduated from the University of Toronto in 1949 and rather than join the Leafs, he thought he would study for the priesthood and entered St. Joseph's Seminary in Edmonton. He discovered that the priesthood was not his calling and returned to play with the Leafs in 1950.

In 1951 McCormack married Margaret Anne Gordon, a recent nursing graduate from the Hospital for Sick Children. Conn Smythe, Leaf's owner, generously provide a honeymoon to Pittsburgh for the couple.

McCormack went on to a successful business career mostly spent in the steel industry including starting his own business.

He died in 2017.

Career statistics

Regular season and playoffs

References

External links
 

1925 births
2017 deaths
Buffalo Bisons (AHL) players
Canadian ice hockey centres
Chicago Blackhawks players
Edmonton Flyers (WHL) players
Ice hockey people from Edmonton
Montreal Canadiens players
Ontario Hockey Association Senior A League (1890–1979) players
Pittsburgh Hornets players
Stanley Cup champions
Toronto Maple Leafs players
Toronto Marlboros players
Toronto St. Michael's Majors players
Tulsa Oilers (USHL) players